Earlysville is an unincorporated community and census-designated place in Albemarle County, Virginia, United States, roughly  north of Charlottesville. It was first listed as a CDP in the 2020 census with a population of 1,153.

History 

It is named for John Early (1773–1833), a relative of Confederate general Jubal Early. In 1822, John Early bought just under  of land from his father-in-law that now comprise a portion of the town. Earlysville has a small central business district (pictured at right), with a grocery store, restaurant, dentist, daycare, mechanic, and several retail stores. As of January 2019 there remains only a thrift store, an auto repair shop, a United States Post Office, and many churches. There is a nearby light industrial park and several small suburban developments. The bulk of the area is rural in character.

The community was the original location of Michie Tavern, before its 1927 relocation adjacent to Monticello. Historic structures still located in Earlysville include Earlysville Union Church, Longwood, and Buck Mountain Episcopal Church.

Notable residents or former residents
Raymond Austin AKA Raymond DeVere-Austin (director), director and producer.
Wendy DeVere-Austin (writer),
Robert Llewellyn, photographer.
George Allen, former United States Senator.
David M. Bailey, singer-songwriter.
Mark Helprin, novelist, journalist, and conservative commentator.

References

External links
Earlysville (virginia.org)
Earlysville (cvillepedia.org)
The Earlysville Oak

Unincorporated communities in Albemarle County, Virginia
Unincorporated communities in Virginia
Census-designated places in Albemarle County, Virginia
Census-designated places in Virginia